Aloe wildii is a grasslike aloe. It is native to a small area in south-east Africa and, like other succulent plants, it is resistant to drought. It bears attractive bright orange-red blossoms.

Distribution
It is quite strictly confined to west facing (leeward) slopes over a 100 km stretch of mountainous terrain between Cashel and Chipinga in southern Manicaland, Zimbabwe.

References 

wildii